Carangas is a province in the northern parts of the Bolivian department of Oruro.

Location
Carangas province is one of sixteen provinces in the Oruro Department. It is located between 17° 59' and 18° 54' South and between 67° 09' and 67° 45' West.

It borders San Pedro de Totora Province in the northwest, Sajama Province in the west, Litoral Province in the southwest, Sud Carangas Province in the southeast, Saucarí Province in the east, and Nor Carangas Province in the northeast.

The province extends over 105 km from North to South, and 75 km from east to west.

Population
The main language of the province is Aymara, spoken by 94%, while 84% of the population speak Spanish and 13% Quechua.

The population increased from 7,930 inhabitants (1992 census) to 10,505 (2001 census), an increase of 32.5%. - 43.1% of the population is younger than 15 years old.

92.5% of the population have no access to electricity, 98.1% have no sanitary facilities.

79.8% of the population are employed in agriculture, 0.1% in mining, 3.5% in industry, 16.6% in general services (2001).

72% of the population are Catholics, 23% are Protestants (1992).

Division
The province comprises two municipalities which are further subdivided into cantons.

See also 
 Jach'a Jawira
 Jayu Quta
 Kimsa Chata
 Parina Quta
 Qullpa Jawira

External links
Population data (Spanish)

Provinces of Oruro Department